Kuchesfahan (also Romanized as Kūcheşfahān and Kuch-i-Isfahān; also known as Kushk-Isfagan) is a city and capital of Kuchesfahan District, in Rasht County, Gilan Province, Iran . At the 2006 census, its population was 8,351, in 2,463 families.

Etymology
Some etymologists believe that in the past, a number of people from Esfahān had migrated to this city, therefore it was named Kuch-e Esfahān. Kuch is the Persian (and Gileki) for migration, and Kuch-e Esfahān means The Esfahān Migration.
Some other believe that in the Safavid era, when Esfahān was the capital of Iran, as Kuchesfahān was governmentally similar to Esfahān, people called it Kuche Esfahān. Kuche is the Gileki for small, and Kuche Esfahān means The Small Esfahān.

History
Kuchesfahān is a historical city dating back to the Sassanian era. The most famous historical site of the city is the Murghāne Purt bridge. Also, there are some religious monuments in the city.

Culture
Agriculture is the most popular job in the city and rice is its most important product.
The people speak Gileki and Persian.
Gile-mardi wrestling (local type of wrestling in Gilan) have been a popular sport in the past.

References

Populated places in Rasht County
Cities in Gilan Province